Jiří Hašek (born November 15, 1977) is a Czech professional ice hockey player. He played with HC Kladno in the Czech Extraliga during the 2010–11 Czech Extraliga season.

References

External links

1977 births
Czech ice hockey forwards
Rytíři Kladno players
Living people
Sportspeople from Ostrava
HC RT Torax Poruba players
Hokej Šumperk 2003 players
HC Bílí Tygři Liberec players
HC Oceláři Třinec players
HC Berounští Medvědi players
HK Dukla Trenčín players
HC Slovan Ústečtí Lvi players
Czech expatriate ice hockey players in Slovakia